Løvset is a surname. Notable people with the surname include:

Jørgen Løvset (1896–1981), Norwegian professor of medicine, gynecology, and obstetrics
Mons Arntsen Løvset (1891–1972), Norwegian businessman, newspaper editor, and politician 

Norwegian-language surnames